The 1988–89 season was the 90th completed season of the Football League.

No European qualification took place due to the Heysel Stadium disaster suspension in place.

Prior to the 1986–87 season membership of the Football League was dependent on a system of election by the other member teams.  From 1986 that system came to an end, and instead, the club finishing last in the Fourth Division was automatically demoted to Conference. This season the casualty was Darlington.

First Division

A fiercely-contested title race went right to the wire, with the title-deciding game featuring both contenders not being played until 26 May – six days after the FA Cup final – as the league season was extended following the Hillsborough disaster on 15 April, in which 97 Liverpool fans died. Liverpool went on to lift the trophy in the second all-Merseyside FA Cup final in four seasons, and a strong second half of the season had taken them to the top of the league; they needed only a draw at home to second-placed Arsenal to clinch the title. The Gunners, on the other hand, needed to win by at least two clear goals to beat the Merseysiders to the title, and that was exactly what they did.  A late goal from Michael Thomas ended Arsenal's 18-year wait to be champions of England again, the only time the English league has been decided by goals scored. 

There were no shortage of rivals for the title throughout the season. Millwall, in the First Division for the first time, frequently topped the table during the season's early stages and were consistently in the top five until well after Christmas, and still managed to finish 10th despite not winning any of their final 10 games. Norwich City, who also reached the semi-finals of the FA Cup, were strong contenders for most of the season and finished fourth. Third placed Nottingham Forest, who won the League Cup and the Full Members Cup (their first pieces of silverware since winning the European Cup in 1980) had a mediocre first half of the season before finding their form after Christmas, although they never looked like serious title contenders. Their East Midlands rivals Derby County were on the fringes of the title race for much of the season, and their fifth-place finish was their highest for well over a decade. 

Three teams who were among the pre-season title favourites failed to make an impact in the title race. Everton could only manage an eighth-place finish, their lowest final position since 1982, although they did well in the cup competitions, finishing runners-up in the FA Cup and Full Members Cup. Tottenham, who had spent millions in the transfer market since Terry Venables became manager, were bottom of the table in late October but enjoyed an upturn in form during the second half of the season to secure sixth place in the final table. Manchester United continued to rebuild under Alex Ferguson, but a failure to convert draws into victories during the first half of the season and a run of bad results during the season's final stages dragged them down to 11th place in the final table; a good run of form after Christmas had projected them into the fringes of the title race, but their season ultimately collapsed after an FA Cup quarter-final exit. 

The loss of Paul Gascoigne to Tottenham in the first £2 million deal between English clubs gave Newcastle manager Willie McFaul a chance to spend heavily in the transfer market, but his signings failed to gel and he was sacked in October with the Tynesiders bottom of the First Division. His successor Jim Smith was unable to keep Newcastle up, and they went down in bottom place, while Smith's old club QPR finished a steady ninth under new player-manager Trevor Francis. John Lyall's 15-year spell as West Ham manager came to an end after relegation and the decision of the board not to renew his contract. The final relegation place went to Middlesbrough, who had enjoyed good form for a newly promoted side (and one which had been virtually bankrupt and in the Third Division in 1986) until a late slump dropped them back into the Second Division. Aston Villa narrowly avoided the drop after a similar downturn in performances during the season's final stages.

First Division results table

Managerial changes

First Division maps

Second Division

Chelsea sealed an instant return to the First Division by sealing the Second Division title and gaining 99 points – the highest total in the club's history. Runners-up Manchester City, with a promising young side including Andy Hinchcliffe, David White and Paul Lake, returned to the elite after two seasons away as runners-up. Steve Coppell's rejuvenation of Crystal Palace finally paid off and five seasons and two near misses with promotion when they triumphed over Blackburn Rovers in the two-legged playoff final and overturned a two-goal deficit in the first leg which had looked to have ended the Lancashire side's 23-year absence from the First Division. Defeat in the semi-finals prevented an instant return to the First Division for Watford, while the other beaten semi-finalists Swindon narrowly missed out on matching the four-season rise from the Fourth Division to the First achieved earlier in the decade by Swansea and Wimbledon.

Despite the loss of manager Ron Atkinson to Atletico Madrid in October, West Bromwich Albion remained in the thick of the promotion race under new player-manager Brian Talbot and looked all set for promotion as late as February when they occupied second place, but a slump in form pushed them down to ninth place – not enough for even a place in the playoffs.

Second Division play-offs

Both the semifinals and the finals were decided over two legs.The full results can be found at: Football League Division Two play-offs 1989.

Second Division results

Second Division maps

Third Division

Wolverhampton Wanderers, spearheaded by high-scoring striker Steve Bull, clinched a second successive promotion – again as champions – as they ran away with the Third Division title just 12 months after finishing champions of the Fourth Division. Bull, who broke the 50-goal barrier in all competitions for the second successive season, then became one of the few Third Division players to be selected for the senior England side when he was capped for his country for the first time. Sheffield United clinched the second promotion place a season after relegation – the fifth time in less than a decade that their manager Dave Bassett had managed a promotion-winning team, following his four promotions with Wimbledon. The final promotion place went to playoff winners Port Vale, who returned to the Second Division for the first time since 1957. 

Aldershot's two-season stay in the Third Division ended with relegation in bottom place after a disastrous season. Gillingham, who had almost won promotion two years earlier, as did Chesterfield, and a Southend side whose 54 points was a greater tally than any other team to suffer relegation in Football League history.

Third Division play-offs

Both the semifinals and the finals were decided over two legs.The full results can be found at: Football League Division Three play-offs 1989.

Third Division results

Third Division maps

Fourth Division

Rotherham United sealed an instant return to the Third Division as champions of the Fourth Division, while runners-up Tranmere (who had been in the battle to avoid relegation to the Conference two seasons earlier) managed to climb out of the league's basement division after spending a whole decade there. The final automatic promotion place went to Crewe, who had spent 20 consecutive seasons in the Fourth Division and had to apply for re-election seven times, before the arrival of Dario Gradi as manager in June 1983 had overseen an upturn in fortunes at Gresty Road. 

Promotion had seemed out of the question for Leyton Orient, when they stood 15th in the league on 1 March 1989 with barely a quarter of the season left to play. But an excellent finish to the season saw them rise to sixth place in the final table, and they triumphed in the playoffs to clinch the division's fourth and final promotion place.

Darlington were relegated from the league as the Fourth Division's bottom club, after a post-Christmas resurgence by Colchester after the Essex side appointed Jock Wallace as manager, and the league newcomers for 1989–90 were Conference champions Maidstone United.

Fourth Division play-offs

Both the semifinals and the finals were decided over two legs.The full results can be found at: Football League Division Four play-offs 1989.

Fourth Division results

Fourth Division maps

See also
 1988–89 in English football

References

 
English Football League seasons